Bakong is the first Khmer temple mountain of sandstone constructed by rulers of the Khmer Empire at Angkor near modern Siem Reap in Cambodia. In the final decades of the 9th century AD, it served as the official state temple of King Indravarman I in the ancient city of Hariharalaya, located in an area that today is called  Roluos.

The structure of Bakong took shape of stepped pyramid, popularly identified as temple mountain of early Khmer temple architecture. The striking similarity of the Bakong and Borobudur temple in Java, going into architectural details such as the gateways and stairs to the upper terraces, suggests strongly that Borobudur was served as the prototype of Bakong. Contact is inferred to have occurred between the Khmer kingdom and the Sailendra dynasty in Java, who would have transmitted to Cambodia not only ideas, but also technical and architectural details of Borobudur, including arched gateways in corbelling method.

History
In 802 AD, the first king of Angkor Jayavarman II declared the sovereignty of Cambodia. After ups and downs, he established his capital at Hariharalaya. A few decades later, his successors constructed Bakong in stages as the first temple mountain of sandstone at Angkor. The inscription on its stele (classified K.826) says that in 881 King Indravarman I dedicated the temple to the god Shiva and consecrated its central religious image, a lingam whose name Sri Indresvara was a combination of the king's own and the suffix "-esvara" which stood for Shiva ("Iśvara"). According to George Coedès, the devarāja cult consisted in the idea of divine kingship as a legitimacy of royal power, but later authors stated that it doesn't necessarily involve the cult of physical persona of the ruler himself.

Bakong enjoyed its status as the state temple of Angkor for only a few years, but later additions from the 12th or 13th century testify that it was not abandoned. Toward the end of the 9th century, Indravarman's son and successor Yasovarman I moved the capital from Hariharalaya to the area north of Siem Reap now known as Angkor, where he founded the new city of Yaśodharapura around a new temple mountain called Bakheng.

Site

The site of Bakong measures 900 metres by 700 metres, and consists of three concentric enclosures separated by two moats, the main axis going from east to west. The outer enclosure has neither a wall nor gopuram and its boundary is the outer moat, which is only partially visible today. The current access road from NH6 leads at the edge of the second enclosure. The inner moat delimits a 400 by 300 metres area, with remains of a laterite wall and four cruciform gopuram, and it is crossed by a wide earthen causeway, flanked by seven-headed nāgas, such as a draft of nāga bridge . Between the two moats there are the remains of 22 satellite temples of brick. The innermost enclosure, bounded by a laterite wall, measures 160 metres by 120 metres and contains the central temple pyramid and eight brick temple towers, two on each side. A number of other smaller buildings are also located within the enclosure. Just outside the eastern gopura there is a modern buddhist temple.

The pyramid itself has five levels and its base is 65 by 67 metres. It was reconstructed by Maurice Glaize at the end of the 1930s according to methods of anastylosis. On the top there is a single tower that is much later in provenance, and the architectural style of which is not that of the 9th century foundations of Hariharalaya, but that of the 12th-century temple city Angkor Wat.

Though the pyramid at one time must have been covered with bas relief carvings in stucco, today only fragments remain.  A dramatic scene-fragment involving what appear to be asuras in battle gives a sense of the likely high quality of the carvings.  Large stone statues of elephants are positioned as guardians at the corners of the three lower levels of the pyramid.  Statues of lions guard the stairways.

Gallery

See also

 Wat Bakong
 Angkor
 Architecture of Cambodia
 Preah Ko
 Lolei
 Hariharalaya

Footnotes

References

Angkorian sites in Siem Reap Province